Maximillian Albert George (born 6 September 1988) is an English singer, best known as the lead singer of the boy band The Wanted.

George started his career as a footballer, playing for Preston North End. After an injury ended his football career, he decided to pursue a music career. George made his singing debut with the band Avenue. After the group disbanded in 2009, George joined the newly formed band, The Wanted. In 2014, following The Wanted's success in the United States, he landed his first acting role in the sixth season of the American television series Glee in the role of Clint, the leader of "Vocal Adrenaline".

In 2013, George starred in the E! channel reality series The Wanted Life.

Early life 
George was born on 6 September 1988 in Swinton, Greater Manchester and studied at Bolton School.

Music career

Avenue and The X Factor 

George joined the four-piece boy band Avenue in 2005. After applying to The X Factor in 2006, the band auditioned for the third series of the competition singing an a cappella version of the Will Young song, "Leave Right Now". They were mentored by Louis Walsh after completing the bootcamp and judges' house portion. Making it to the final 12, the band then signed a management contract with the series. After it was discovered they were already under contract with another management firm, they were disqualified from the show. Following the disqualification, they were signed to the Crown Music Management recording label and were awarded an album deal with Island Records.

In 2008, Avenue released their debut single, "Last Goodbye" and George appeared naked on the magazine cover of AXM. The single peaked when charting at number 50 on the UK Singles Chart and their plans to go on tour were cancelled. The group disbanded in 2009.

The Wanted 

In 2009, a mass audition was held by Jayne Collins to form a boy band, after successfully launching Parade and The Saturdays. George auditioned and was selected as one of five members, along with Nathan Sykes, Siva Kaneswaran, Tom Parker and Jay McGuiness out of the thousands of others who auditioned. The band was formed and together they worked on their debut album before finding a perfect name for their band, The Wanted. Their debut album "All Time Low" was released on 25 July 2010, debuted at number one on the UK Singles Chart. Their second single, "Heart Vacancy" was released on 17 October 2010. The song hit number two on the UK Singles Chart, and at number 18 in Ireland. Their third single, "Lose My Mind" was released on 26 December 2010. The song peaked number 19 on the UK Singles Chart, and peaked at number 30 in Ireland. In 2011, the single was released in Germany and in 2012, in the United States. In 2013, in support of a crossover appeal to the American music market, the group starred in their own reality series on E!. The series, The Wanted Life only aired for one season.

The band announced their decision to break in January 2014. Max, as a member of the band has sold over 12 million records worldwide.
The Wanted returned in 2021

Solo artist 
In January 2014, George revealed in an interview that he was signed as a solo artist by Scooter Braun. On 3 July 2018 he released his first solo single "Barcelona". The song has more than 4.5 million streams on Spotify. On 24 May 2019 he released his second single "Better On Me".

Other ventures

Modelling 
In June 2013, George was named as the new face and spokesmodel for Buffalo denim's fall line. He starred in the campaign opposite Sports illustrated swimsuit model, Hannah Davis. In November 2013, he did an underwear campaign for Buffalo again.

Acting career 
George is signed with Creative Artists Agency since 2013. In June 2014, George revealed his decision to enroll in elocution classes, to help improve his pursuit of an acting career. In September 2014, it was confirmed that he had joined the cast of Glee in the role of Clint, after Mark Salling shared a photo of him on Twitter hanging out with Max on the set of the final season of the US comedy drama. He made his first on screen appearance on 9 January 2015.

On 2 February 2015, it was announced that George had joined the cast of Bear Grylls' TV survival series titled Bear Grylls: Mission Survive. The show is about eight celebrities pushed to the limit by Grylls. The team will be making their dangerous journey through the jungle, where they will be competing for 12-day survival mission.

Strictly Come Dancing 
On 1 September 2020, it was announced that George would be taking part in the eighteenth series of Strictly Come Dancing. He was partnered with Australian dancer Dianne Buswell.

George left the series after being voted out in Week 4.

Radio 
On 7 July 2021, it was announced that George would be joining Hits Radio, presenting Friday Night Hits, every Friday from 7-10pm across the Hits Radio Network. His first show was on 9 July 2021.

Personal life 
George was in a relationship with actress Michelle Keegan from December 2010. The couple became engaged in June 2011, but ended their relationship the following year. In 2013, he began dating Sports Illustrated model Nina Agdal. They split in February 2014. In October 2014, he confirmed being in a relationship with Miss Oklahoma contestant Carrie Baker. In September 2022, it was revealed that he is dating Maisie Smith.

Filmography

Discography

Singles

References

External links 
 
 
 Max George performs 'Hey Mickey' in Glee
 Max George performs 'We built this city' in Glee

1988 births
Living people
21st-century British male singers
21st-century English male actors
21st-century English singers
Association footballers not categorized by position
British male songwriters
English footballers
English male singers
English male television actors
English pop singers
English songwriters
Musicians from Greater Manchester
People educated at Bolton School
People from Swinton, Greater Manchester
The Wanted members
Avenue (group) members